Hugh Evans  was Dean of St Asaph from 26 April 1560 until his death on 17 December 1587.

Evans was educated at Brasenose College, Oxford. He was appointed a Prebendary of St Paul's Cathedral in 1558. He also held livings at Cwm, Northop, Cerrigydrudion and Henllan.

References 

16th-century Welsh Anglican priests
Alumni of Brasenose College, Oxford
Deans of St Asaph
1587 deaths